Zir Deh Mosque is related to the 10th century Solar Hijri calendar and is located in Yazd Province, Ardakan.

References

Mosques in Iran
Mosque buildings with domes
National works of Iran